Mille Haslev Nordbye (born March 6, 2001) is a Norwegian curler from Lillehammer. She currently plays second on the Norwegian women's curling team skipped by Marianne Rørvik.

Career
Nordbye joined the Norwegian junior women's curling team as the second for the 2016–17 season. In her second season with the team, skipped by Maia Ramsfjell, they finished third at the 2018 World Junior B Curling Championships. This qualified them for the 2018 World Junior Curling Championships, where they were able to reach the playoffs with a 5–4 record. The team then lost in the semifinal and bronze medal game, settling for fourth place. They ended the season by winning the 2018 Norwegian Women's Curling Championship. Because of their high placement at the 2018 championship, the team earned direct qualification into the 2019 World Junior Curling Championships. There, they finished in seventh place with a 3–6 record, enough to avoid relegation to the B Championship. They also won their second straight Norwegian women's championship title.

Team Ramsfjell remained as the junior representatives for the 2019–20 season. On tour, the team won their first World Curling Tour event at the WCT Latvian International Challenger. At the 2020 World Junior Curling Championships, the team finished in eighth place, again with a 3–6 record. They ended their season with their third consecutive Norwegian women's title. After the 2019–20 season, Nordbye left the junior team to join the Norwegian women's team skipped by Marianne Rørvik with second Eli Skaslien and lead Martine Rønning.

Team Rørvik began the 2021–22 season representing Norway at the 2021 Pre-Olympic Qualification Event. There, the team went 3–1 in the round robin, however, did not advance to the playoffs due to their draw shot challenge. The team then represented Norway at the 2021 European Curling Championships B Division where they went 7–2 through the round robin. This qualified them for the semifinal where they beat England 10–4 before winning 10–7 over Latvia in the gold medal game, securing promotion into the 2022 A Division. The first place finish also qualified them for the 2022 World Qualification Event for the chance to qualify for the 2022 World Women's Curling Championship. At the event, the Norwegian team went a perfect 6–0 through the round robin to earn the top spot in the playoff round. They then lost to Denmark, before beating Latvia to earn a spot at the Women's Championship. There, the team went 5–7 in the round robin, finishing in eighth place. Also during the 2021–22 season, the team finished second at the 2022 Norwegian Women's Curling Championship to Eirin Mesloe.

Personal life
Nordbye is a sports science student.

Teams

References

External links

Norwegian female curlers
Living people
Sportspeople from Lillehammer
2001 births
21st-century Norwegian women